Jesús Suárez Cueva (born 10 March 1955 in Bobes) is a Spanish former professional racing cyclist.

Major results

1977
 1st Trofeo Elola
1978
 1st Overall Vuelta a Aragón
 1st Overall GP Leganés
 2nd Klasika Primavera
 2nd Trofeo Masferrer
1979
 1st Stage 2 Setmana Catalana de Ciclisme
 1st Stage 7 Volta a Catalunya
 1st Stage 3 Vuelta a Cantabria
 1st Stage 4 Vuelta a Asturias
 2nd GP Pascuas
 3rd Klasika Primavera
1980
 1st Overall Vuelta a La Rioja
 1st Stage 7B Volta a Catalunya
 1st Stage 2 Tour of the Basque Country
 2nd GP Pascuas
1981
 1st Stage 5 Vuelta a Cantabria
 1st Stage 11 Vuelta a España
 1st Stage 2 Vuelta a Asturias
 2nd Trofeo Luis Puig
 6th Overall Vuelta a Andalucía
 7th Subida al Naranco
 9th Overall Volta a Catalunya
1982
 1st Klasika Primavera
1983
 1st Stage 7 Vuelta a España
1984
 1st Stage 18 Vuelta a España
 1st Stage 7 Herald Sun Tour
 2nd Trofeo Masferrer
1985
 1st Stage 10 Herald Sun Tour
 1st Stage 6 Vuelta a Cantabria
 3rd Trofeo Masferrer
1986
 10th Subida al Naranco
1989
 2nd National Road Race Championships

References

1955 births
Living people
Spanish male cyclists
Spanish Vuelta a España stage winners
People from Siero
Cyclists from Asturias